Epitizide is a diuretic. It is often combined with triamterene.

References

Diuretics
Organofluorides
Thioethers
Benzothiadiazines
Sulfonamides